Liberty Township is one of six townships in Union County, Indiana, United States. As of the 2010 census, its population was 1,042 and it contained 447 housing units.

Geography

Unincorporated towns
 Dunlapsville at 
 Roseburg at 
(This list is based on USGS data and may include former settlements.)

Adjacent townships
 Brownsville Township (north)
 Center Township (east)
 Union Township (southeast)
 Harmony Township (south)
 Jennings Township, Fayette County (west)
 Waterloo Township, Fayette County (northwest)

Cemeteries
The township contains these two cemeteries: Patterson and Silver Creek.

Lakes
 Whitewater Lake

Landmarks
 Whitewater Memorial State Park (vast majority)

School districts
 Union County-College Corner Joint School District

Political districts
 Indiana's 6th congressional district
 State House District 55
 State Senate District 43

Notes

References
 United States Census Bureau 2007 TIGER/Line Shapefiles
 United States Board on Geographic Names (GNIS)
 IndianaMap

External links
 Indiana Township Association
 United Township Association of Indiana

Townships in Union County, Indiana
Townships in Indiana